Twelve teams qualified for the men's field hockey at the 2020 Summer Olympics .

Table

 – Japan qualified both as the hosts and the continental champions, therefore that quota is added to the FIH Olympic Qualifiers rather than going to the runners-up of the tournament.

2018 Asian Games

The champion of the men's field hockey tournament at the 2018 Asian Games qualifies for the Olympics. If Japan is the winner, the quota place is added to the qualification events rather than going to the runner-up.

Qualified teams

Preliminary round

Pool A

Pool B

Final round

Final standings

2019 Pan American Games

Qualified teams

Preliminary round

Pool A

Pool B

Classification round

Final standings

2019 African Olympic Qualifier

Teams

Pool

2019 EuroHockey Championship

Qualified teams

Preliminary round

Pool A

Pool B

Final round

Final ranking

2019 Oceania Cup

Pool

Olympic qualifying events

Originally, twelve teams were to take part in the Olympic qualifying events. These teams were to be drawn into six pairs; each pair playing a two-match, aggregate score series. The winner of each series qualifies for the Olympics. As Japan won the 2018 Asian Games (thereby qualifying twice, once as host and once as Asian champions), there will instead be 14 teams, 7 of whom will qualify.

Qualification

Matches
The draw for the final seven qualification ties was held on 9 September 2019. The ties will be played over two legs, both in the home team's venue.

See also
Field hockey at the 2020 Summer Olympics – Women's qualification

Notes

References

 
Men
Qualification
Field hockey at the Summer Olympics – Men's qualification